Sâg is a commune located in Sălaj County, Crișana, Romania. It is composed of five villages: Fizeș (Krasznafüzes), Mal (Ballaháza), Sâg, Sârbi (Krasznatótfalu) and Tusa (Tuszatelke).

Sights 
 Wooden church in Sâg (built in the 18th century), historic monument
 Wooden church in Tusa (built in the 18th century), historic monument

References

Communes in Sălaj County
Localities in Crișana